Pawan Shakland Suyal (born 15 October 1989) is an Indian cricketer who played for Delhi in domestic cricket. He is a left-arm medium-pace bowler who is currently a part of Delhi Daredevils squad in the Indian Premier League.

Ahead of the 2018–19 Ranji Trophy, he transferred from Delhi to Nagaland. However, in July 2019, the Nagaland Cricket Association (NCA) released Suyal ahead of the 2019–20 cricket season, following a poor performance in the Syed Mushtaq Ali Trophy.

References

External links 

Living people
1989 births
Indian cricketers
Delhi cricketers
Mumbai Indians cricketers
North Zone cricketers
People from Pauri
Delhi Capitals cricketers
Nagaland cricketers
People from Uttarakhand